Alan Rubin (February 11, 1943 – June 8, 2011), also known as Mr. Fabulous, was an American musician. He played trumpet, flugelhorn, and piccolo trumpet.

Early life and education 
Rubin was born in Brooklyn. He began attending Juilliard School of Music in New York when he was 17 and studied with William Vacchiano, who was principal trumpet in the New York Philharmonic. Vacchiano described Rubin as his best student. While at Juilliard, Rubin was invited to play with Paul Hindemith on his last concert tour of the United States, but Rubin chose instead to play with Peggy Lee at the Village Vanguard. Rubin dropped out of Juilliard at 20 to tour with singer Robert Goulet as his lead trumpet player.

Career 
Rubin was a member of the Saturday Night Live Band, with whom he played at the Closing Ceremony of the 1996 Olympic Games. As a member of The Blues Brothers, he portrayed Mr. Fabulous in the 1980 film, the 1998 sequel and was a member of the touring band. In the first film, Rubin's character is maitre d' at an expensive restaurant before Jake and Elwood persuade him to rejoin the band. The nickname "Mr Fabulous" was given to Rubin by John Belushi.

Rubin played with an array of artists, such as Frank Sinatra, Frank Zappa, Duke Ellington, Blood, Sweat & Tears, Gil Evans, Eumir Deodato, Sting, Aerosmith, The Rolling Stones, Paul Simon, James Taylor, Frankie Valli, Eric Clapton, Billy Joel, B.B. King, Miles Davis, Yoko Ono, Peggy Lee, Aretha Franklin, James Brown, Ray Charles, Cab Calloway, and Dr. John. Rubin contributed to over 6000 recording sessions.

Rubin's last performance was with The Blues Brotherhood (Blues Brothers tribute show) at B.B. King's in New York City on October 12, 2010. The performance also featured Tom "Bones" Malone and Lou "Blue Lou" Marini.

Personal life 
Rubin died from lung cancer at Memorial Sloan Kettering Cancer Center in New York City and he was cremated.

Discography

With Patti Austin
 Havana Candy (CTI, 1977)

With Gato Barbieri
 Chapter Three: Viva Emiliano Zapata (Impulse!, 1974)

With George Benson
 White Rabbit (CTI, 1972)
 Bad Benson (CTI, 1974)

With The Blues Brothers
 Briefcase Full of Blues (Atlantic, 1978)
 The Blues Brothers (Atlantic, 1980)
 Made in America (Atlantic, 1980)
 The Blues Brothers Band Live in Montreux (Atlantic, 1990)
 Red, White & Blues (Turnstyle, 1992)
 Blues Brothers 2000 (Universal, 1998)

With Jimmy Buffett
 Off to See the Lizard (MCA, 1989)

With Ron Carter
 Anything Goes (Kudu, 1975)

With Stanley Clarke
 School Days (album) (Nemperor, 1976)

With Linda Clifford
 I'll Keep On Loving You (Capitol, 1982)

With Hank Crawford
 Wildflower (Kudu, 1973)
 I Hear a Symphony (Kudu, 1975)
 Mr. Chips (Milestone Records, 1986)
 Night Beat (Milestone, 1989)
 Groove Master (Milestone, 1990)
 Tight (Milestone, 1996)

With Sheena Easton
 No Sound But a Heart (EMI, 1987)

With Donald Fagen
 Kamakiriad (Reprise, 1993)

With Aretha Franklin
 Get It Right (Arista, 1983)

With Gloria Gaynor
 Experience Gloria Gaynor (MGM, 1975)
 I've Got You (Polydor, 1976)
 Glorious (Polydor, 1977)

With Johnny Hammond
 Higher Ground (Kudu, 1973)

With Levon Helm
 Levon Helm & the RCO All-Stars (ABC, 1977)
 Levon Helm (ABC, 1978)

With Jennifer Holliday
 Say You Love Me (Geffen, 1985)

With Cissy Houston
 Think It Over (Private Stock, 1978)

With Jackie and Roy
 Time & Love (CTI, 1972)

With Garland Jeffreys
 One-Eyed Jack (A&M, 1978)
 Guts for Love (Epic, 1982)

With Billy Joel
 The Bridge (1986)

With Hubert Laws
 Morning Star (CTI, 1972)

With O'Donel Levy
 Simba (Groove Merchant, 1974)

With Fred Lipsius
 Better Believe It  (mja Records, 1996)

With Herbie Mann
 Brazil: Once Again (Atlantic, 1977)

With Jimmy McGriff
 Red Beans (Groove Merchant, 1976)
 Tailgunner (LRC, 1977)

With Sinéad O'Connor
 Am I Not Your Girl? (Chrysalis, 1992)

With Yoko Ono
 A Story (Rykodisc, 1997)

With Lou Reed
 Sally Can't Dance (RCA, 1974)

With Don Sebesky
 Giant Box (CTI, 1973)

With Carly Simon
 Hello Big Man (Warner Bros., 1983)

With Paul Simon
 Graceland (Warner Bros., 1986)

With Lonnie Smith
 Keep on Lovin' (Groove Merchant, 1976)

With Phoebe Snow
 Never Letting Go (Columbia, 1977)

With Ringo Starr
 Ringo's Rotogravure (Polydor, 1976)

With James Taylor
 Walking Man (Warner Bros., 1974)

With Tina Turner
 Love Explosion (United Artists, 1979)

With Stanley Turrentine
 Nightwings (Fantasy, 1977)

With Frankie Valli
 Closeup (Private Stock 1975)

With Randy Weston
 Blue Moses (CTI, 1972)

With Jim Steinman'
 Bad For Good(Epic, 1981)

Filmography

References

External links

Video: Flugelhorn solo on 'To touch you again'
Video: Alan Rubin 'She's funny that way' 1959

1943 births
2011 deaths
American male film actors
American session musicians
American jazz trumpeters
American male trumpeters
Juilliard School alumni
Rhythm and blues trumpeters
The Blues Brothers members
Saturday Night Live Band members
Deaths from lung cancer in New York (state)
American jazz flugelhornists
American male jazz musicians